Astrid Steverlynck (born 24 February 1968) is an Argentine alpine skier. She competed at the 1988 Winter Olympics and the 1992 Winter Olympics.

References

1968 births
Living people
Argentine female alpine skiers
Olympic alpine skiers of Argentina
Alpine skiers at the 1988 Winter Olympics
Alpine skiers at the 1992 Winter Olympics
Place of birth missing (living people)